In algebraic combinatorics, the Kruskal–Katona theorem gives a complete characterization of the f-vectors of abstract simplicial complexes. It includes as a special case the Erdős–Ko–Rado theorem and can be restated in terms of uniform hypergraphs. It is named after Joseph Kruskal and Gyula O. H. Katona, but has been independently discovered by several others.

Statement 

Given two positive integers N and i, there is a unique way to expand N as a sum of binomial coefficients as follows:

 

This expansion can be constructed by applying the greedy algorithm: set ni to be the maximal n such that  replace N with the difference, i with i − 1, and repeat until the difference becomes zero. Define

Statement for simplicial complexes 

An integral vector  is the f-vector of some -dimensional simplicial complex if and only if

Statement for uniform hypergraphs 

Let A be a set consisting of N distinct i-element subsets of a fixed set U ("the universe") and B be the set of all -element subsets of the sets in A. Expand N as above. Then the cardinality of B is bounded below as follows:

Lovász' simplified formulation 

The following weaker but useful form is due to  Let A be a set of i-element subsets of a fixed set U ("the universe") and B be the set of all -element subsets of the sets in A. If  then .

In this formulation, x need not be an integer.

Ingredients of the proof 

For every positive i, list all i-element subsets a1 < a2 < … ai of the set N of natural numbers in the colexicographical order. For example, for i = 3, the list begins

 

Given a vector   with positive integer components, let Δf be the subset of the power set 2N consisting of the empty set together with the first  i-element subsets of N in the list for i = 1, …, d. Then the following conditions are equivalent:

 Vector f is the f-vector of a simplicial complex Δ.
 Δf is a simplicial complex.
 

The difficult implication is 1 ⇒ 2.

History
The theorem is named after Joseph Kruskal and Gyula O. H. Katona, who published it in 1963 and 1968 respectively.
 writes that the earliest of these references, by Schützenberger, has an incomplete proof.

See also 
Sperner's theorem

References 
. Reprinted in 

.
.
.
.

.
.

External links 
Kruskal-Katona theorem on the polymath1 wiki

Algebraic combinatorics
Hypergraphs
Families of sets
Theorems in combinatorics